The White Light Tour is the fifth concert tour by Irish band, The Corrs, beginning in January 2016. The tour promoted the band's sixth studio album, White Light (2015), after more than 9 years hiatus status.

Opening acts
The Shires
 Jamie Lawson

Initial setlist 

 "I Do What I Like"
 "Give Me a Reason"
 "Forgiven, Not Forgotten"
 "Bring On the Night"
 "What Can I Do"
 "Radio"
 "Lough Erin Shore" / "Trout in the Bath" / "Joy of Life"
 "Runaway"
 "With Me Stay"
 "Ellis Island"
 "Buachaill on Eirne"
 "Love to Love You"
 "Only When I Sleep"
 "Queen of Hollywood"
 "Kiss of Life"
 "Dreams"
 "I Never Loved You Anyway"
 "So Young"
Encore
 "White Light"
 "Breathless"
 "Toss the Feathers"

Tour dates

Box office score data

References

The Corrs concert tours
2016 concert tours